The 2017–18 season was Olympique de Marseille's 68th professional season since its creation in 1899 and 22nd consecutive season in the top flight. The club participated in Ligue 1, Coupe de France, Coupe de la Ligue and the UEFA Europa League.

Squad

Reserves

Out on loan

Transfers

Summer

In:

Out:

Friendlies

Competitions

Ligue 1

League table

Results summary

Results by round

Results

Coupe de France

Coupe de la Ligue

UEFA Europa League

Third qualifying round

Play-off round

Group stage

Knockout phase

Round of 32

Round of 16

Quarter-finals

Semi-finals

Final

Statistics

Appearances and goals

|-
! colspan=14 style=background:#dcdcdc; text-align:center| Goalkeepers

|-
! colspan=14 style=background:#dcdcdc; text-align:center| Defenders

|-
! colspan=14 style=background:#dcdcdc; text-align:center| Midfielders

|-
! colspan=14 style=background:#dcdcdc; text-align:center| Forwards

|-
! colspan=14 style=background:#dcdcdc; text-align:center| Players transferred out during the season

Goalscorers

References

Olympique de Marseille seasons
Marseille
Marseille